Viola Dana (born Virginia Flugrath; June 26, 1897 – July 3, 1987) was an American film actress who was successful during the era of silent films. She appeared in over 100 films, but was unable to make the transition to sound films.

Early life
Born Virginia Flugrath on June 26, 1897 in Brooklyn, New York City, where she was raised, she was the middle sister of three siblings who all became actresses. Her sisters were known as Edna Flugrath and Shirley Mason. Dana appeared on the stage at the age of three. She read Shakespeare and particularly identified with the teenage Juliet. She enjoyed a long run at the Hudson Theater in Manhattan. Between 1910 and 1912, she made four small appearances in the emergent film industry in New York, using the name Viola Flugrath. A particular favorite of audiences was her performance in Eleanor Gates' Poor Little Rich Girl when she was 16.

She began performing in vaudeville with Dustin Farnum in The Little Rebel and played a bit part in The Model by Augustus Thomas.

Film career

With the stage name of Viola Dana, she entered films in 1910, including A Christmas Carol (1910). Her first motion picture was made at a former Manhattan (New York) riding academy on West 61st Street. The stalls had been transformed to dressing rooms. Dana became a star with the Edison Manufacturing Company, working at their studio in the Bronx. She fell in love with Edison director John Hancock Collins, and they married in 1915. Dana's success in Collins's Edison features such as Children of Eve (1915) and The Cossack Whip (1916) encouraged producer B.A. Rolfe to offer the couple lucrative contracts with his company, Rolfe Photoplays, which released through Metro Pictures Corporation. Dana and Collins accepted Rolfe's offer in 1916 and made several films for Rolfe/Metro, notably The Girl Without a Soul and Blue Jeans (both 1917). Rolfe closed his New York-area studio in the face of the 1918 flu pandemic and sent most of his personnel to California. Dana left before Collins, who was finishing work at the studio; however, Collins contracted influenza and died in a New York hotel room on October 23, 1918.

Dana remained in California acting for Metro throughout the 1920s, but her popularity gradually waned. One of her latter roles was in Frank Capra's first film for Columbia Pictures, That Certain Thing (1928). She retired from the screen in 1929. Her final screen credits are roles in Two Sisters (1929), One Splendid Hour (1929), and with her sister Leonie Flugrath, better known as Shirley Mason (years earlier she had appeared with her older sister, Edna Flugrath, in the 1923 film The Social Code), in The Show of Shows (1929). By the time she made her final film appearance in 1933, she had appeared in over 100 films. She briefly came out of retirement to appear in her first and only television role in a small part on Lux Video Theatre in 1956.

More than 50 years after her retirement from the screen, Dana appeared in the Kevin Brownlow/David Gill documentary series Hollywood (1980), discussing her career as a silent film star during the 1920s. Footage from the interview was used in the later documentary series Buster Keaton: A Hard Act to Follow (1987) from the same team.

Personal life
Dana's first husband was Edison director John Collins who died in the influenza pandemic of 1918. In 1920, she began a relationship with Ormer "Lock" Locklear, an aviator, military veteran and budding film star. Locklear died when his aircraft crashed on August 2, 1920 during a nighttime film shoot for The Skywayman. Although married, Locklear had been dating Dana, and on the night before his death, in a premonition, gave her some of his personal effects. Dana witnessed the 1920 crash and did not fly again for 25 years.

Locklear was reputed to be the prototype for the character of Waldo Pepper played by Robert Redford in The Great Waldo Pepper (1975). Dana was an honored guest at its premiere.

Dana was married to Yale football star and actor Maurice "Lefty" Flynn in June 1925. They divorced in February 1929. Her third and final marriage was to golfer Jimmy Thomson from 1930 to March 1945. In later years, she volunteered at the Motion Picture & Television Country House and Hospital, and she moved there permanently in 1979. In 1986, one year before her death, she was the subject of a documentary short by Anthony Slide titled Vi: Portrait of a Silent Star, in which she talks of her life and career.

Death
Dana died on July 3, 1987 at the Motion Picture & Television Country House and Hospital in Woodland Hills, Los Angeles at the age of 90. Her urn at Hollywood Forever Cemetery lists her as Viola Dana as well as her birth name Flugrath.

For her contribution to the motion picture industry, Viola Dana has a star on the Hollywood Walk of Fame. It is located at 6541 Hollywood Boulevard.

Filmography

Short subject
A Christmas Carol (1910)
Children Who Labor (1912) as The Immigrant's Older Daughter
The Butler and the Maid (1912) as The Statue
How Father Accomplished His Work (1912) as The Second Daughter
The Lord and the Peasant (1912) as Mary's Sister
The Third Thanksgiving (1912)
Molly the Drummer Boy (1914) as Molly Mason
My Friend from India (1914) as Gertie Underholt
Treasure Trove (1914) as Cora Fairfield
The Blind Fiddler (1914) as The Fairy
The Adventure of the Hasty Elopement (1914) as Ruth
Seth's Sweetheart (1914) as Sally
Who Goes There? (1914) as Kate - Toppy's Sweetheart
Lena (1915) as Euphemia Miggles
A Thorn Among Roses (1915) 
The Stone Heart (1915) as Nan Cowles
The Glory of Clementina (1915) as Etta Concanna
A Spiritual Elopement (1915) as Evelyn Banks
The Portrait in the Attic (1915) as Thelma
A Theft in the Dark (1915) as Lady Genevieve
The Stoning (1915) as Ruth Fenton
The Slavey Student (1915) as Alma Picket
Her Happiness (1915) as Viola Winters
The Strange Case of Poison Ivy (1933)

Features

The House of the Lost Court (1915, lost film) as Dolores Edgerton
Cohen's Luck (1915, lost film) as Minnie Cohen
 On Dangerous Paths (1915, lost film) as Eleanor Thurston
Gladiola (1915, lost film) as Gladiola Bain
Children of Eve (1915) as Fifty-Fifty Mamie
The Innocence of Ruth (1916) as Ruth Travers
The Flower of No Man's Land (1916, lost film) as Echo
The Light of Happiness (1916, lost film) as Tangletop
The Gates of Eden (1916, lost film) as Eve / Evelyn
The Cossack Whip (1916) as Darya Orlinsky
Threads of Fate (1917) as Dorothea
Rosie O'Grady (1917, lost film) as Rosie O'Grady
The Mortal Sin (1917, lost film) as Jane Anderson
God's Law and Man's (1917, lost film) as Ameia
Lady Barnacle (1917, lost film) as Lakshima
Aladdin’s Other Lamp (1917, lost film) as Patricia Smith (Patsy)
The Girl Without A Soul (1917) as Unity Beaumont / Priscilla Beaumont
Blue Jeans (1917) as June
The Winding Trail (1918, lost film) as Audrey Graham
A Weaver of Dreams (1918, lost film) as Judith Sylvester
Breakers Ahead (1918, lost film) as Ruth Bowman
Riders of the Night (1918) as Sally Castleton
The Only Road (1918) as Nita
Opportunity (1918) as Mary Willard
Flower of the Dusk (1918, print, Bois d'Arcy) as Barbara North
The Gold Cure (1919, lost film) as Annice Paisch
Satan Junior (1919) as Diana Ardway
The Parisian Tigress (1919, lost film) as Jeanne
False Evidence (1919) as Madelon MacTavish
Some Bride (1919, lost film) as Patricia Morley
The Microbe (1919, lost film) as Happy O'Brien, The Microbe
Please Get Married (1919, lost film) as Muriel Ashley
The Willow Tree (1920) as O-Riu
Dangerous to Men (1920, lost film) as Eliza
The Chorus Girl's Romance (1920) as Marcia Meadows
Blackmail (1920, lost film) as Flossie Golden
Cinderella's Twin (1920, lost film) as Connie McGill
The Off-Shore Pirate (1921, lost film) as Ardita Farnam
Puppets of Fate (1921) as Sorrentina Palombra
Home Stuff (1921) as Madge Joy
Life's Darn Funny (1921, lost film) as Zoe Roberts
The Match-Breaker (1921, lost film) as Jane Morgan
There Are No Villains (1921, lost film) as Rosa Moreland
The Fourteenth Lover (1922) as Vi Marchmont
Glass Houses (1922, lost film) as Joy Duval
Seeing's Believing (1922) as Diana Webster
 They Like 'Em Rough (1922, lost film) as Katherine
The Five Dollar Baby (1922, lost film) as Ruth
June Madness (1922) as Clytie Whitmore
Love in the Dark (1922, lost film) as Mary Duffy
Crinoline and Romance (1923, lost film) as Miss Emmy Lou
Her Fatal Millions (1923) as Mary Bishop
Hollywood (1923) as Viola Dana
 Rouged Lips (1923) as Norah MacPherson
The Social Code (1923, lost film) as Babs Van Buren
In Search of a Thrill (1923) as Ann Clemance
 A Noise in Newboro (1923, lost film) as Martha Mason
The Heart Bandit (1924, lost film) as Molly O'Hara
 Don't Doubt Your Husband (1924, lost film) as Helen Blake
The Beauty Prize (1924, lost film) as Connie Du Bois
Revelation (1924) as Joline Hofer
Merton of the Movies (1924, lost film) as Sally Montague, 'Flips'
Open All Night (1924) as Thérèse Duverne
Along Came Ruth (1924, lost film) as Ruth Ambrose
As Man Desires (1924, lost film) as Pandora La Croix
Forty Winks (1925, lost film) as Eleanor Butterworth
The Necessary Evil (1925, lost film) as Shirley Holmes
Winds of Chance (1925) as Rouletta Kirby
The Great Love (1925, lost film) as Minette Bunker
Wild Oats Lane (1926, lost film) as Marie, the Girl
Bigger Than Barnum's (1926) as Juanita Calles
Kosher Kitty Kelly (1926, incomplete film, missing one reel) as Kitty Kelly
The Ice Flood (1926) as Marie O'Neill
The Silent Lover (1926) as Scadsza
Bred in Old Kentucky (1926) as Katie O'Doone
Home Struck (1927) as Barbara Page
Salvation Jane (1927) as Salvation Jane
Naughty Nanette (1927) as Nanette Pearson
Lure of the Night Club (1927) as Mary Murdock
That Certain Thing (1928) as Molly Kelly
Two Sisters (1929, lost film) as Jean / Jane
One Splendid Hour (1929) as Bobbie Walsh
The Show of Shows (1929, black-and-white version is extant, and the technicolor version is partially extant) as Performer in 'The Pirate,' 'Meet My Sister' & 'Ladies of the Ensemble' Numbers

Gallery

References

Notes

Citations

Bibliography

 Farmer, James H. Celluloid Wings: The Impact of Movies on Aviation. Blue Ridge Summit, Pennsylvania: Tab Books Inc., 1984. .
 "From the Movies to Stardom". Ogden Standard, January 10, 1914, p. 27.
 "Little Viola Dana Ambitious to Become Grown-Up Actress". Indianapolis Star, January 15, 1914, p. 13.
 "Viola Dana In Person at Faurot". Lima News'', March 23, 1930, p. 24.

External links 

Viola Dana photo gallery

Viola Dana at Virtual History

1897 births
1987 deaths
20th-century American actresses
Actresses from New York City
American child actresses
American film actresses
American silent film actresses
American stage actresses
American television actresses
Burials at Hollywood Forever Cemetery
People from Brooklyn
Vaudeville performers
Articles containing video clips